Stryper is an American Christian metal band from Orange County, California. The group's lineup consists of Michael Sweet (lead vocals, guitar), Oz Fox (guitar), Perry Richardson (bass guitar), and Robert Sweet (drums).

Formed in 1983 as Roxx Regime, the band soon changed their musical message to reflect their Christian beliefs, and the band's name was also changed to Stryper. They went on to become the first overtly Christian heavy metal band to gain acceptance in the mainstream. In 1983, they signed with major label Enigma Records and released their debut album The Yellow and Black Attack. In the mid-1980s, Stryper enjoyed their most successful period beginning with the release of To Hell with the Devil, which achieved platinum sales status. Stryper went on to release two more gold albums before disbanding in 1993. In 2003, Stryper came out of retirement for a reunion tour and subsequently signed a multi-album contract with Big3 Records in 2005. In 2013, they signed a multi-album deal with Frontiers Records, and have released Second Coming, which includes 14 re-recorded songs from their first three albums and an album, No More Hell to Pay, released on November 5, 2013, Fallen on October 16, 2015, and God Damn Evil on April 25, 2018, Even the Devil Believes on September 4, 2020, and The Final Battle on October 21, 2022.

Origin of name 
The name "Stryper" derives from the King James Version of the Bible. "But he was wounded for our transgressions, he was bruised for our iniquities:
the chastisement of our peace was upon him; and with his stripes we are healed." The reference is frequently included as part of their logo. Stryper's drummer, Robert Sweet, also created a backronym for their name: "salvation through redemption, yielding peace, encouragement and righteousness".

History

Foundation and mainstream success (1975–1990) 
The Sweet brothers became Christians in 1975, but began to pull away from their faith. The Sweet brothers rejoined the church after their friend Kenny Metcalf (their first tour keyboardist) persuaded them to do so.

Inspired by bands such as Van Halen, but distressed by their message, they sought to form a band that would extol their worldview and beliefs. Stryper was originally known as Roxx Regime and composed of brothers Michael Sweet on lead vocals and lead guitar and Robert Sweet on drums while Eric Johnson played bass, rounding out the trio. Oz Fox eventually joined the band. Before Oz Fox joined the band, a number of guitarists almost joined Roxx Regime, including Doug Aldrich (later of Dio) and C.C. DeVille (later of Poison). The name "Stryper" was adopted when bassist Tim Gaines joined the band though the label urged the band to change its name. The scripture reference, from a passage in Isaiah 53:5, "By His stripes we are healed", became part of the band's logo. Shortly afterward, they released the EP The Yellow and Black Attack on July 21, 1984. During this period, Stryper opened for bands like Ratt and Bon Jovi, leading some fans and critics to claim that they were not a true Christian band. Stryper's first full-length album, Soldiers Under Command, released on May 15, 1985, was the band's first gold record.

Stryper's third album, To Hell with the Devil, was released on October 24, 1986, and went platinum after spending three months on Billboards album charts, eventually selling more than 2 million copies. In addition to being Stryper's most successful record, it was both the first contemporary Christian music and Christian metal album to achieve this feat. "Calling on You", "Free" and "Honestly" were hugely popular MTV hits in 1987—so much so, that "Free" and "Honestly" both became most-requested songs on the show Dial MTV. They were also the second Christian band to get any airplay on MTV, Degarmo & Key having been the first with their song "666." "Honestly" is Stryper's highest-charting song, peaking at No. 23 on the Top 40 charts. The album received a Grammy Award nomination for Best Gospel Performance by a Duo or Group, Choir or Chorus. Michael Sweet is the band's primary songwriter.

Bassist Tim Gaines did not participate in the recording of To Hell with the Devil, and for a short period of time prior to the release of the record he was replaced by Matt Hurich. Hurich was not with the band more than a month, although he was outfitted with a yellow and black striped bass and a racing costume. Brad Cobb played bass on the album. However, when the promotional photos for the album were being shot, Gaines returned to the band and subsequently participated in its successful world tour. In 1987, the band headlined the Dynamo Open Air Festival in the Netherlands.

Stryper's fourth album, In God We Trust, released on June 28, 1988, also went gold, and the song "Always There for You" briefly entered the lower levels of the pop charts, peaking at No. 71 despite it being another massive hit on MTV. However, the sound of the album was more pop-oriented than previous releases and a number of critics, as well as Stryper fans, criticized the record for being over-produced. In addition, the image of the band was moving even closer to the glam metal look of the era, giving fans something else to criticize. These factors led to lower sales, and the album spent only five weeks charting on Billboard. The second single and video, "I Believe in You", peaked at No. 88 and a third single "Keep the Fire Burning" failed to chart. As with the previous album, Tim Gaines did not participate in the recording (Brad Cobb once again played bass) but later rejoined the group for another world tour. In God We Trust garnered two GMA Dove Awards for "Hard Music Album" and "Hard Music Song" for the title track.

 Decline, break-up and solo projects (1990–1999) 

On August 21, 1990, Stryper released the controversial album Against the Law, which drastically changed the band's image and lyrical message. While their earlier albums all had yellow and black colors in the covers and the lyrics spoke of God and salvation, Against the Law featured the band with black leather clothes and with no mention of the word "God" in the lyrics at all. The band's musical sound was also heavier, closer to classic metal. Drummer Robert Sweet said that the change of image and sound was in response to the criticism of the previous album and an attempt to leave behind their glam metal image. The album sold poorly. This was partly due to rumors in the press (both mainstream and Christian) that Stryper's music was trending towards a more mainstream sound as their Christian faith weakened. Fans wondered why they covered Earth Wind & Fire's 1975 song "Shining Star". The video for it would not be a hit on MTV- the first Stryper video that was not. Two other videos followed for "Two Time Woman" and "Lady" which generated minimal airplay. However, many critics still considered the album to be Stryper's best musical production to date.

On July 20, 1991, after being signed to Hollywood Records by label exec Wesley Hein (who had originally signed them to his Enigma Records), Stryper released a greatest hits collection called Can't Stop the Rock, which featured two new songs. One of which was the Gulf War inspired "Believe". The band continued to tour until February 1992, when frontman Michael Sweet departed the band citing artistic differences and to pursue a solo career.

In early 1992 Stryper fulfilled some commitments in Europe as a trio with Oz Fox on lead vocals. Soon after, on May 5, they performed two shows at Knott's Berry Farm in Buena Park, California. They asked Dale Thompson of the Christian metal band Bride to fill in on lead vocals hoping he would join the band. It was during one of the concerts that Robert Sweet unexpectedly announced that Dale Thompson was going to be their new lead singer. This, however, was later denied by Thompson. In early 1993 the band played several more European dates as a trio with their last show on March 27, 1993, in Sportzentrum, Greifensee, Switzerland. 

 Reunions & recent works (1999–present) 

The former members of Stryper first reunited in 1999, when Michael Sweet and SinDizzy were invited to play at a summer rock festival in Cabo Rojo, Puerto Rico. As an encore, Sweet joined Oz Fox and Tim Gaines on stage and played several Stryper songs. Later, in 2000, the first "Stryper Expo" was held in New Jersey, and for the first time in 8 years the complete line-up of Stryper took the stage. That same year, a concert was held in Costa Rica at which the four members played together. A second "Stryper Expo" took place in Los Angeles in 2001.

Hollywood Records asked the former members of Stryper to record tracks for a new greatest hits compilation in 2003 7: The Best of Stryper. The compilation was released with two new songs, "Something" and "For You", marking Stryper's first new music since the early 1990s. A tour followed in support. The band played 36 shows in the United States and finished the tour in San Juan, Puerto Rico. A live album, titled 7 Weeks: Live in America, 2003, was released the following year, and the concert in Puerto Rico was filmed for a live DVD produced and directed by Jack Edward Sawyers. However, that show in Puerto Rico proved to be the last for the original line-up of Stryper until their 2010 reunion. Gaines and the band parted ways in 2004 before they were slated to play Disney's Night of Joy in Orlando. Michael's bassist on his previous solo tours, Tracy Ferrie, replaced him.

Stryper's next album, Reborn, was released on August 16, 2005, and was the band's first full-length CD of original material in 15 years. It was produced by Michael Sweet. The new album received a positive response from fans and critics, some of whom labeled Reborn as one of the best albums of that year. With a more modern sound incorporating aspects of alternative rock and grunge, along with fewer guitar solos, the new record updates their style while keeping the Stryper identity. The record was written by Michael Sweet. 

In 2006, the band released the DVD Greatest Hits: Live in Puerto Rico with Music Video Distributors. Stryper was scheduled to open for extreme thrash metal band Slayer, headlining in Mexico. A few months later, Slayer pulled out of the Mexican tour and cancelled their headline for personal reasons.

In November 2006, Stryper announced new management. They also announced a follow-up to Reborn tentatively due in early to mid 2007. However, that February saw lead singer Michael Sweet postponing the release of the new album two days before its recording was to begin. Sweet's wife Kyle had been diagnosed with stage four ovarian cancer, and the new album was put on hold so that he could care for his family and ailing wife. She underwent surgery and treatment from February 14 to July 14. In April 2008, Kyle announced that her cancer had returned as of October 2007. The new album was in the mixing stage as of January 2008, and Sweet said that it should be released in July or August. Michael Sweet performed with the band Boston in 2007 and was asked to join the band as co-lead vocalist and guitarist and toured with Boston in 2008 with Styx as the opening act. On March 5, 2009, Michael Sweet's wife, Kyle, died from cancer. Murder by Pride was released on July 21, 2009, with the lead single "Peace of Mind" preceding it.

The Covering, a collection of 12 cover songs from bands that inspired Stryper and helped to shape the band's sound and musical identity was on Big3 Records/Sony and was produced by Michael Sweet. Along with the covers, it includes a new, original recording: "God". On September 14, 2010, it was announced that the album's first single, a cover of Black Sabbath's "Heaven and Hell", was available for download on iTunes. The album was released on February 15, 2011.

The band signed a deal with Frontiers Records and released Second Coming March 25, 2013.

No More Hell to Pay, was completed on May 29, 2013, and was released on November 5, through Frontiers Records. Live at the Whisky, a CD/DVD combination recorded at the Whisky a Go Go, was released in September 2014. Fallen, was released on October 16, 2015.

In September 2016, frontman Michael Sweet announced the band will be going on hiatus due to personal issues affecting bassist Timothy Gaines. The hiatus will begin once the band has completed the To Hell With the Devil 30th Anniversary Tour. Sweet stated they will not continue without Gaines as the band made a pact to only stay together as they are. During the hiatus the band members will pray about the direction of the band going forward.

During an interview with Antihero Magazine in November 2016, Michael Sweet revealed that the next Stryper album, which was planned for a February 2017 release, would be put on-hold as the band went on hiatus, and while he recorded a Sweet & Lynch album. Sweet also stated that bassist Timothy Gaines was taking time away from the band to deal with personal issues. While Sweet disliked the idea of continuing without Gaines, he was open to filling the bass position with the right person if and when it came to that. Gaines then confirmed that he was no longer a member of the band. Following the band's hiatus, they issued a statement informing that Gaines had been fired from the band, and removed from the roster on the band's website. Gaines claimed that he had been kicked out of the band after being issued an ultimatum. Perry Richardson was announced as the new bass player on October 30, 2017.

On February 5, 2018, Michael Sweet announced the band's next album, God Damn Evil, which was released April 20, 2018. On February 9, the band released "Take It to the Cross" as a single for the album featuring Matt Bachand of the band Shadows Fall.

On September 4th, 2020, the band's next album, Even the Devil Believes, was released.

The band's latest album, The Final Battle was announced on September 22, 2022, and released on October 21, 2022.

 Music and image 

During the 1980s, Stryper represented the popular glam metal style of the time, characterized by highly visual performances, twin guitar solos, Michael Sweet's high-pitched, multi-octave screams and big hair. A characteristic element of the band was that all their outfits, sets, and instruments were painted in yellow and black stripes. The number of the stripes represented in various stage props and costumes increased during the show, leading up to In God We Trust. The band explained the symbolism of the stripes: a direct reference to the whiplash scourges given by Pontius Pilate to Jesus, and draws wording from the King James Version of the Bible's Isaiah 53:5 that relates to the motif of the suffering servant. A trademark of the band's stage act was drummer Robert Sweet's practice of turning his enormous drum kit sideways to the audience so that the crowd could see him playing. This is why Robert was more often called a "visual timekeeper" rather than a drummer.

Apart from its ubiquitous yellow and black stripes, Stryper had other distinctive trademarks. During concerts, Stryper threw Bibles to the concert crowd— editions of the New Testament with the band's logo stickers affixed to them. As a protest against "666" symbols popular among many heavy metal fans of the era, Stryper promoted an alternative numerological symbol; Stryper's trademark use of the "777" symbol subsequently became quite popular among Christian metalheads. Although the number "777" is not actually referenced by the Bible (as opposed to 666, which is famously mentioned in The Book of Revelation as The Number of the Beast) the number "7" is traditionally (in Christian symbolism) associated with divine perfection. The Los Angeles Times reported in 1985 that "the band gets sullen fans of Twisted Sister cheering and poking stubby 'one way' fingers heavenward—a refutation of the double-fingered 'devil horns' salute of many metal groups".

 Legacy 

Stryper was the first openly Christian heavy metal band to gain recognition in the mainstream music world. Mark Joseph states "The Yellow and Black Attack was propelled by the group's success in Japan, which was largely due to an endorsement of the band by famed rock critic Masa Itoh, the man who ruled the Japanese hard rock/metal scene, who many fans looked to for his evaluation of bands. Itoh had heard of Stryper, gotten in touch with their manager Daryn Hinton, and liked what he heard. When he gave the band a positive review in Japan's heavy metal bible Burrn! magazine and played the album on his radio show, Stryper suddenly found themselves at the top of the metal heap in Japan with a record that was outselling Mötley Crüe, Bon Jovi, and every other metal band."

Stryper has not been free of controversy. Many Christian critics did not approve of the group's association with the heavy metal subculture, which has often been associated with Satanic imagery. Other Christian detractors viewed the band's flashy costumes as incongruous with the modesty in dress often associated with sincere practitioners of devout Christianity. Televangelist Jimmy Swaggart was a particularly prominent critic, likening Stryper's practice of distributing the New Testament at their shows to "casting pearls before swine". Swaggart's condemnation may not have been a surprise, however, as Stryper was supported by the rival Jim Bakker ministries, who are thanked on several Stryper albums. A 1985 CCM magazine article by Chris Willman, who was also writing for the Los Angeles Times, stated that "Stryper was the target of scattered picketing, boycott threats, and righteous denunciations". For example, concert-goers were often greeted by protesters armed with bullhorns and distribution of Gospel tracts. "It was just like if Ozzy Osbourne was there. They gave us the same treatment, laughs Daryn Hinton."

In 1990, Rolling Stone magazine reported that the band had become disillusioned with Christian music. This, combined with a notable shift in tone in the band's lyrics, led to Against the Law being banned from many Christian bookstores. The Benson Company, Stryper's sole tie to the Christian market, dropped this album from distribution.

Stryper has sold over 10 million recordings worldwide, and it is estimated that two-thirds of their albums were bought by non-Christians. In 2011, Stryper won the readers choice award for Best Christian / Gospel Artists & Bands. Kim Jones of About.com states, "With 44% of the vote, hard rock legends Stryper beat out all of their competition to be named the best Christian hard rock band, bringing to mind the old adage, 'like a fine wine, some things just get better with age.'"

Ian Christe, author of the heavy metal history book Sound of the Beast: The Complete Headbanging History of Heavy Metal, mentions the album To Hell with the Devil in his book as one of the landmarks of the glam metal movement.

The song "To Hell with the Devil" appears on the Rhino Records release The Heavy Metal Box, a compilation mainly of secular classic metal bands like Iron Maiden, Judas Priest, and Metallica, as well as hair bands like Twisted Sister and Poison.

In his autobiography A Lion's Tale: Around the World in Spandex, professional wrestler Chris Jericho mentions that, as he got into heavy metal music as a teenager, Stryper was one of his favorite bands, and during the very beginning of his wrestling career on the Canadian independent circuit, his ring attire was black and yellow, which he purposely did as a tribute to the band.

MembersCurrent Michael Sweet – lead vocals, guitar, keyboards, piano (1982–1992, 1999–2001, 2003–present)
 Robert Sweet – drums, percussion (1982–1993, 2000–2001, 2003–present)
 Oz Fox – guitar (1983–1993, 1999–2001, 2003–present), backing vocals (1983–1992, 1999–2001, 2003–present), lead vocals (1992–1993)
 Perry Richardson – bass, backing vocals (2017–present)Former Eric Johnson – bass, backing vocals (1982)
 Scott Lane – guitar, backing vocals (1983)
 John Voorhees – bass, backing vocals (1983)
 Tim Gaines – bass, backing vocals, keyboards, piano (1983–1986, 1986–1993, 1999–2001, 2003–2004, 2010–2017)
 Matt Hurich – bass, backing vocals (1986)
 Tracy Ferrie – bass, backing vocals (2004–2010)Session John Van Tongeren – keyboards (The Roxx Regime Demos), bass, keyboards (Soldiers Under Command, To Hell with the Devil, In God We Trust)
 Christopher Currell – synclavier, guitar (Soldiers Under Command)
 Billy Meyers – keyboards (In God We Trust)
 Steve Croes – synclavier (In God We Trust)
 Brad Cobb – bass (To Hell with the Devil, In God We Trust)
 John Purcell – keyboards (Against the Law)
 Jeff Scott Soto – background vocals (Against the Law)
 Randy Jackson – bass (Against the Law)
 Brent Jeffers – drums, keyboards (Against the Law), (1986–1990 touring)
 Tom Werman – percussion (Against the Law)
 Kenny Aronoff – drums (Murder by Pride)
 Charles Foley – keyboards (touring)
 Kenny Metcalf – keyboards (1985, 1986 touring)Timeline'''

 Discography 

 The Yellow and Black Attack (1984)
 Soldiers Under Command (1985)
 To Hell with the Devil (1986)
 In God We Trust (1988)
 Against the Law (1990)
 Reborn (2005)
 Murder by Pride (2009)
 The Covering (2011)
 Second Coming (2013)
 No More Hell to Pay (2013)
 Fallen (2015)
 God Damn Evil (2018)
 Even the Devil Believes (2020)
 The Final Battle'' (2022)

References

Further reading 
 
 
 
 .

External links
 
 
 

American Christian metal musical groups
Christian rock groups from California
Enigma Records artists
Frontiers Records artists
Glam metal musical groups from California
Hard rock musical groups from California
Heavy metal musical groups from California
Hollywood Records artists
Musical groups established in 1983
Musical groups disestablished in 1993
Musical groups reestablished in 2003
Musical groups from Orange County, California
Musical quartets